The Price of Sugar is a 2013 Dutch drama film based on the eponymous novel by Cynthia McLeod.

The film premiered as the opening film of the Netherlands Film Festival on Wednesday 25 September 2013. The Kijkwijzer labelled it as for 16 years and above and also gave the warnings of violence, coarse language and discrimination. The miniseries was shown by VARA in February and March 2014. The first broadcast took place on Saturday 8 February 2014 in the Netherlands. The series uses the same footage as in the film, but the series has over an hour of additional film material.

Cast 
 Gaite Jansen as Sarith
 Neil Sandilands as Reinder Almersma
 Yootha Wong-Loi-Sing as Mini-Mini
 Kees Boot as Julius Robles Medina
 Yannick van de Velde as Rutger le Chasseur
  as Elza

References

External links 

2013 drama films
2013 films
Films about slavery
Films set in Suriname
Films shot in Suriname
Dutch drama films